John Gimson (born 11 March 1983) is an Olympic Silver Medallist and two time World Champion in sailings Mixed multihull Olympic discipline.  He lives in Congleton. In 2020 he became world champion in the Nacra 17 World Championship with partner Anna Burnet. They were selected for the British Olympic team and gained silver medals at the 2020 Summer Olympics. The pair continued their good run to win the 2021 World and European Championships.

A veteran by the standards of many, John Gimson has forged a career in various formats of sailing and followed up success in the lead-up to Tokyo alongside Anna Burnet with silver in the Nacra 17 class at the 2020 Games.

The duo won the 2020 Nacra 17 World Championships plus silver medals at the 2019 European Championships, World Cup Final and the Olympic test event.

Gimson's youth career yielded silver medals at the World and European Championships and his CV also features a 2013 Americas Cup appearance, as well as eight years racing keelboats.

Gimson joined Iain Percy and Andrew Simpson in 2012 as their training partner in the Star class for the Olympic cycle ahead of the London Games but the Star class was dropped as an Olympic event following 2012, leading to his eventual switch to Nacra 17.

He and Burnet would cap off a remarkable day for British sailing on the Olympic stage in Japan, making history winning a silver Medal, the first ever British team to do so in the Mixed multihull, which has only appeared in 2 Olympics.

The pair continued their good run to win the 2021 World and European Championships.

Career
He represented Team GB, along with partner Anna Burnet, in the Nacra 17 class at the 2020 Summer Olympics in Tokyo winning a silver medal. Gimson's World Championship success includes winning the 2020 Nacra 17 Worlds and 2nd Place at the 29er World Championships.

References

External links 
 
 
 
 
 

1983 births
Living people
British male sailors (sport)
Olympic sailors of Great Britain
Sailors at the 2020 Summer Olympics – Nacra 17
Nacra 17 class sailors
Nacra 17 class world champions
World champions in sailing for Great Britain
Sportspeople from Leicester
People from Congleton
Medalists at the 2020 Summer Olympics
Olympic medalists in sailing
Olympic silver medallists for Great Britain